Erynephala is a genus of skeletonizing leaf beetles in the family Chrysomelidae. There are six described species in Erynephala. They are found in North America and the Neotropics.

Species
These six species belong to the genus Erynephala:
 Erynephala brighti Blake, 1970
 Erynephala glabra Blake, 1936
 Erynephala interrupta (Jacoby, 1904)
 Erynephala maritima (J. L. LeConte, 1865)
 Erynephala morosa (J. L. LeConte, 1857)
 Erynephala puncticollis (Say, 1824) (beet leaf beetle)

References

Further reading

 
 
 
 

Galerucinae
Chrysomelidae genera
Articles created by Qbugbot
Taxa named by Doris Holmes Blake